Arthur Cracroft Gibson (7 November 1863 – 8 December 1895) was an English cricketer who played five in first-class cricket matches for Kent County Cricket Club in 1883 and 1884. Born at Sittingbourne in Kent, Gibson was a right-handed batsman who bowled right-arm medium pace.

Gibson made his debut in first-class cricket for Kent in 1883 against MCC. He played in three further first-class matches in 1883 before making his final first-class appearance in 1884 against Sussex. He died at Whitehill near Faversham in Kent in December 1895 aged 32.

References

External links

1863 births
1895 deaths
People from Sittingbourne
English cricketers
Kent cricketers